Malomykolaivka is a village in Synelnykove Raion, Dnipropetrovsk Oblast (province) of Ukraine.

Prior to 18 July 2020, Malomykolaivka was previously located in Petropavlivka Raion.

References

Notes

Villages in Synelnykove Raion